Charlotte Jordan Evans (born 1 June 1995) is an English actress, known for her roles as Gaby Grant in the Netflix series Free Rein and Daisy Midgeley in the ITV soap opera Coronation Street.

Early life
Charlotte Jordan Evans was born on 1 June 1995 in Chobham, Surrey. She attended Oakfield School, a private school in Pyrford, as well as the Susan Robinson School of Ballet in Byfleet. While attending school, she competed in ballet, singing and acting competitions, and achieved a distinction in all of her examinations.

Career
Jordan made her professional acting debut in an episode of The Bill broadcast in 2007, under the name of Charlie Evans. While under that name, she also portrayed the role of Serena in the Nickelodeon series Summer in Transylvania from 2011 to 2012. In 2012, she also joined a pop group created by Geri Halliwell. In 2016, she began acting under the name Charlotte Jordan, and made her debut film appearance in Angel of Decay, as well as making an appearance in the BBC medical drama Casualty. In 2018, Jordan was cast in the Netflix drama series Free Rein as Gaby Grant; she portrayed the role for two series and also starred in Free Rein Christmas and Valentine-themed films. In 2019, she co-wrote and produced a short film titled Tracks. A year later, it was announced that Jordan had joined the ITV soap opera Coronation Street as Daisy Midgeley.

Filmography

References

External links
 

1995 births
21st-century English actresses
Actresses from London
Actresses from Surrey
English child actresses
English film actresses
English soap opera actresses
English television actresses
Living people